Tudor Chirilă (born 28 May 1974 in Bucharest, Romania) is a Romanian actor, musician, composer, and producer. He was the lead singer of the band Vama Veche, after which he founded the band Vama. As an actor, he featured in both short and long movies and has played reference roles in plays of some of the most important Romanian directors.

In 2012, he published his first book, "Exerciții de Echilibru", which has united some of the writings from his personal blog.

In 2014, he became a coach for The Voice Romania, alongside Loredana Groza, Smiley, and Marius Moga. Over the years, Chirilă has been involved in numerous social causes. In 2005, he initiated the campaign "Live pentru viață", which had the intent to gather donations for flood victims.

He supported the fundraiser campaign for children with cancer called "Nu ma ignora", which was initiated by "Salvează Vieți" Association. Along with Agenția de Vise, his management and booking company, he conducted a number of projects with social and cultural impact, some of which are: "Chrilă in licee" – mentorship tour for high schools in Bucharest, "Cruciada Culturii", "Ioan Chirilă Awards".

Biography 
Tudor Chirilă was born in Bucharest on 28 May 1974. He is the son of sports reporter Ioan Chirilă and actress/director Iarina Demian and the brother of the football coach Ionuț Chirilă. He graduated the acting section, in the class of Florin Zamfirescu at the Academy of Theater and Film (UNATC), in Bucharest, 1996.

Actor

Film 
His debut was in 1994 as an extra in the movie Nobody's Children. In 1999, he played the role of a refugee from the former Yugoslavia, in the Austrian movie Nordrand directed by Barbara Albert. In 2001, Chirilă was a guest star in an episode of the Austrian series Kommisar Rex, playing the role of Dimitrij. In 2004, he acted for the movie Milionari de weekend, a Romanian movie directed by Cătălin Saizescu, along with Andi Vasluianu, Maria Dinulescu and Mihai Bendeac. He also played the role of Godzi, a youngster forced by circumstances to be an accomplice to a burglary. Two years later, he featured in the movie Legături bolnăvicioase, alongside Maria Popistașu and Ioana Barbu, directed by Tudor Giurgiu. Between 2006 and 2012 he featured in many short movies, some of them being: Eu sunt eu, directed by Monica Istrate and Love Marketing, directed by Andrei Sota, after his own script. In 2013, he played in the movie The Enemy Within (O ehthros mou), produced by the Greek director Yorgos Tsemberopoulos, where Chirilă played the role of a gang leader. In the same year the short movie The couch produced by Emre Kayiș a year earlier, premiered in the United Kingdom.

In 2017, Warner Bros. Pictures chose the male singer to provides the Romanian voice of Joker in Lego Batman: The Movie, and the singer was happy to improve his acting skills through this new experience, and also dubbed Roger Klotz in 2000 in the animated movie First movie with Doug.

Filmography

Theater 
Over time, Chirilă collaborated with some Romanian theater directors like: Alexandru Tocilescu, Alexandru Darie, Alexandru Dabija, Iarina Demian, Gelu Colceag, Horațiu Mălăele. He debuted in 1995 with "Trupa pe butoaie", a UNITER theater project, coordinated by director Victor Ioan Frunză. Beginning 1996 he was part of the Comedy Theater in Bucharest. In 2004, he is awarded the UNITER award for the role of Malvolio in "Twelfth Night" by William Shakespeare, directed by Gelu Colceag.

Music 
Tudor Chirilă is the lead singer and co-founder of the bands Vama Veche and Vama. Over his career he held live concerts in front of millions of spectators and has been on the main stage of many important festivals like Peninsula, BestFest, Cerbul de Aur, Folk You, Coke Live Festival.

Vama Veche 
In 1996, Chirilă establishes the band Vama Veche with Traian Bălănescu and Liviu Mănescu. The band debuts with the album Nu am chef azi in 1998, Vama Veche in 1999, the maxi single Nu ne mai trageți pe dreapta in 2000, Am să mă întorc bărbat in 2002, Best of Vama Veche in 2006 and Fericire în rate in 2006. In 2003, at the National Theatre Bucharest, the album Am să mă întorc bărbat is turned into a play. It is the first Romanian rock opera, in post-revolution Romania. Some of the well known hits of the band are "Nu am chef azi", "Vara asta", "Epilog", "La Radio", "18 ani", "Vama Veche", "Nu ne mai trageți pe dreapta", "Hotel Cismigiu", "Zmeul". In 2006 the band breaks apart, Tudor Chirilă along with the lead guitar player Eugen Caminschi establish a new band: Vama.

Vama 
Drummer Lucian Cioargă, bass player Dan Opriș and keyboard player Raul Kusak join the two, the latter being replaced by Gelu Ionescu in 2009. In 2007 the first single "Bed for love" is released, a year later Vama released their first album Vama during a show at Bucharest's Arenele Romane via SMS, being the first Romanian band to release an album in this manner. Some of the singles from the album are "Pe sârmă", "Suflet normal", "Dumnezeu nu apare la știri" and "E plin de fete/Sâmbătă seara".

Their next album, 2012 is released on 28 May 2012 at Sala Palatului. Some of the singles from the album are:  "Copilul care aleargă către mare", "Fata în boxeri și în tricoul alb", "Post iubire", "Cântec de găsit". Chirilă writes the script of the music-video "Copilul care aleargă către mare", which he also directs in 2011. In the role of the king he casts Victor Rebengiuc, which was at his first appearance in a music video.

Theater music 
Upon time, Tudor Chirilă did the soundtracks of multiple plays like: Trei femei înalte by Eduard Ablee directed by Vlad Massaci in 1997, O, tată, sărmane tată, mama te-a spânzurat în dulap iar eu sunt foarte trist of Arthur Kopit directed by Iarina Demian in 2000, A fost odată in Brooklyn by Neil Simon directed by Iarina Demian in 2002, Chirița de Bârzoieni, directed and adapted by Iarina Demian, script by Vasile Alecsandri in 2004 – Chirilă composed songs along with Gelu Ionescu O lume pe dos, directed by Iarina Demian in 2010, Prizionierul din Manhattan directed by Iarina Demian in 2012.

Blog 
Initially, Tudor Chirilă's blog was a dedicated virtual space for Chirilă's passion for photography. In 2007 he published the text: "Rolling stones, Smaranda, Luca. Muzica capitalistă", which was also published in the Jurnalul Național (national newspaper), which determined him to write more frequently. Later, he became one of the most visited Romanian bloggers, where Chirilă would share his thoughts, ideas, essays, poems and compositions almost daily. Over time, his blog posts were also took over by the press, by other bloggers and readers. "Scrisoare către liceeni" is one of the posts that got him thousands of online views and had a large impact over youngsters.

Exerciții de echilibru 
In 2012, Tudor Chirilă decided to gather some of his published writings into his first book Exerciții de echilibru. Fragments of compositions, poems, essays, pamphlets, opinionated texts – all have been gathered in the 385 pages of his book, to which Cătălin Tolontan signed the preface. The release took place in November 2012 within The International Book Fair Gaudeamus in Bucharest, with the attendance of some special guests like Cristian Tudor Popescu and Florin Iaru. In a very short time Exerciții de echilibru became a best-seller.

The Voice Romania 
In 2014, Tudor Chirilă became the fourth judge at The Voice Romania, produced and aired by Pro TV. The artist had made the judge team complete, joining Loredana Groza, Marius Moga and Smiley (singer) in the fourth season of the competition. "I like the idea that I could share something from my experience to beginners in the music industry. Secondly, I hope that my presence here will make the pop-rock music known to the general public. I believe that the rock music has energy and freedom and I trust in The Voice and my contestants to remember this to the people". In the first season as a judge on The Voice, Chirilă won the contest with Tiberiu Albu, in the second season he won with Cristina Bălan, in the third with Teodora Buciu, therefore having 3 consecutive wins as a coach.

Other projects 
Apart from the artist career, Chirilă has initiated and supported numerous social and cultural projects.

Chirilă în licee 
In 2009, he initiated a mentorship project which developed into a tour of 20 high schools in Bucharest with the motto: "Descoperă ce-ți place" (discover what you like). Within this campaign, Chirila met with over 5000 high school students and spoke to them about the importance of discovering their own value and talents in due time, and about how to apply them in the future. As a follow-up to the project, a study conducted by psychologists and sociologists with the purpose of showing who the role models of high school students in Bucharest are was carried out.

Cruciada Culturii 
In 2010, Chirilă held the "Cruciada Culturii", a movement initiated by Agenția de vise which was addressed to all those who wished for art to be seen for its real value once again. Some of the most important international classical music artists like Sarah Chang, Joshua Bell, Sam Haywood, Lily Maisky, Mischa Maisky and AdLibitum Quartet held concerts in Bucharest.

Ioan Chirilă Awards 
Starting 2005, the "Ioan Chirilă Awards" were given to the best sport journalists in Romania with the initiative of Chirilă and his mother, Iarina Demian, who wanted to keep the memory of his father, Ioan Chirila, alive in this way. Within the project, every year there was a competition called "Talentul Anului" for amateurs who wanted to become sports journalists. Known as the best distinctions of the Romanian sports journalism, "Ioan Chirilă Awards" were hold six times until 2010, when the project was put on a hold.

Live pentru viață 
"Live pentru viață" was a humanitarian project initiated by Chirilă in 2005 to help flood victims from affected areas. He held a marathon-concert for about 8 hours which helped raise an impressive amount of money.

"Nu mă ignora" 
In 2011, Chirilă was responsible for the script and production of spots for an online humanitarian campaign called "Nu mă ignora", dedicated to children affected by cancer, initiated by the  "Salvează Vieți"  Association. Chirilă, along with other Romanian stars like Andreea Raicu, Cabral, Virgil Iantu, Paula Herlo and Bogdan Dumitrache helped raising funds needed for the foundation of the first Romanian center for diagnosis and treatment of cancer in children.

References

External links 
 

Romanian male television actors
Romanian male film actors
1974 births
Living people
21st-century Romanian male singers
21st-century Romanian singers